A butcher is a person who slaughters animals, dresses their flesh and sells their meat.

Butcher, The Butcher, Butchers,  or Butcher's may also refer to:

People 
 Butcher (surname), a common surname

Epithet

In real life
 Butcher of Amritsar: Reginald Dyer (1864–1927), British Indian Army officer responsible for the Jallianwala Bagh massacre in Amritsar
 Butcher of Baghdad: Saddam Hussein (1937–2006), President of Iraq until deposed in 2003
 Butcher of the Balkans (disambiguation), several people
 Butcher of Balochistan and Butcher of Bengal: Tikka Khan (1915–2002), Pakistan Army four-star general and first Chief of Staff
 Butcher of Bega: Graeme Stephen Reeves (born 1949), Australian deregistered gynecologist and obstetrician
 Butcher of Beijing: Li Peng (李鹏; 1928–2019) top level Chinese Communist Party official known for supporting the use of violence against the Tiananmen Square Protests
 Butcher of Beirut: Ariel Sharon (1928–2014), Israeli Prime Minister and general
 Butcher of Beslan: Shamil Basayev (1965–2006), Chechen militant Islamist and rebel leader
 Butcher of Bosnia: 
 Ratko Mladić (born 1943), Bosnian Serb former general and Chief of Staff of the Army of Republika Srpska
 Radovan Karadžić (born 1945), Bosnian Serb former politician and President of Republika Srpska
 Butcher of La Cabaña: Che Guevara (1928–1967), Argentine Marxist revolutionary, physician, author, guerrilla leader, diplomat and military theorist
 Butcher of Cesena: Antipope Clement VII (1342-1394)
 Butcher of Congo: King Leopold II of Belgium
 Butcher of Drogheda: Oliver Cromwell (1599–1658), Commonwealth military and political leader
 Butcher of Eastern Visayas: Jovito Palparan (born 1950), Filipino fugitive, politician and former army general
 Butcher of Genoa: Friedrich Engel (1909–2006)
 Butcher of Hanover: Fritz Haarmann (1879–1925), German serial killer
 Butcher of Kentucky: Stephen G. Burbridge (1831–1894), Union major general during the American Civil War
 Butcher of Kurdistan: Ali Hassan al-Majid (1941–2010), Iraqi Defense Minister, Interior Minister, military commander and chief of the Iraqi Intelligence Service, better known as "Chemical Ali"
 Butcher of Lyon: Klaus Barbie (1913–1991), World War II SS-Hauptsturmführer and Gestapo member
 Butcher of Mirpur: Abdul Quader Molla (1948–2013), Bangladeshi Islamist leader and politician
 Butcher of Plainfield: Ed Gein (1906–1984), American murderer
 Butcher of Prague: Reinhard Heydrich (1904–1942), German World War II Nazi official and one of the main architects of the Holocaust
 Butcher of Rangoon: Sein Lwin (1923–2004), Burmese brigadier general and briefly President of Myanmar (Burma)
 Butcher of Riga: Eduard Roschmann (1908–1977), Austrian SS officer and commandant of the Riga ghetto during 1943
 Butcher of Rostov: Andrei Chikatilo (1936–1994), Soviet serial killer
 Butcher of Samar: Littleton Waller (1856–1926), US Marine Corps officer
 Butcher of the Somme: Douglas Haig, 1st Earl Haig (1861–1928), British First World War field marshal
 Butcher of Uganda: Idi Amin (c. 1925–2003), President of Uganda and major general
 Butcher of Warsaw: 
 Josef Albert Meisinger (1899–1947), German SS officer 
 Heinz Reinefarth (1903–1979), German SS officer

In fiction
 Butcher of Arlav: Biff Simpson (Hunters)
 Butcher of Bakersfield: Benjamin "Ben" Richards (The Running Man)
 Butcher of Blaviken: Geralt of Rivia (The Witcher)
 Butcher of Bogon: Ratchet (Ratchet & Clank)
 Butcher of Skull Moon: The Doctor (Doctor Who)
 Butcher of Stilwater: The Protagonist/The Boss/"Playa" (Saints Row)
 Butcher of Torfan: Commander Shepard (Mass Effect)
 Butcher of White Orchard: Geralt of Rivia (The Witcher)

Nickname 
 Imre Arakas, Estonian criminal known as "The Butcher"
 Prince William, Duke of Cumberland (1721–1765), son of King George II of Great Britain and general known to his political enemies as "Butcher" Cumberland
 John Ronald Brown (1922–2010), American surgeon convicted of second-degree murder after operating without a license
 Edward Cummiskey (died 1976), New York City mobster known as "The Butcher"
 Robert Hansen (died 2014), an American serial killer, nicknamed the Butcher Baker
 Sir Arthur Harris, 1st Baronet (1892–1984), Marshal of the Royal Air Force during the Second World War
 Gnaeus Pompeius Magnus, "adulescentulus carnifex" (Latin for "The Teenage Butcher"), also known in English as "Pompey the Great"
 Andrew Mrotek (born 1983), "the Butcher", American drummer for the band The Academy Is...
 William Poole (1821–1855), leader of the New York City gang the Bowery Boys, bare-knuckle boxer, and a leader of the Know Nothing political movement, known as "Bill the Butcher"
 Valeriano Weyler, 1st Duke of Rubí (1838–1930), Spanish general and Governor General of the Philippines and Cuba
 Andoni Goikoetxea (born 1956), Spanish footballer, "The Butcher of Bilbao"
 Lisandro Martínez  (born 1998), Argentinian footballer, "The Butcher" or "Butcher of Amsterdam" when playing for Ajax Amsterdam

Aliases 
 The Butcher (Brutus Beefcake, born 1957), ring name of professional wrestler Edward Leslie
 Abdullah the Butcher (born 1941), ring name of professional wrestler Larry Shreve
 "Butcher", a ring name of former professional wrestler Paul Vachon (born 1938)
 The Butcher, ring name of professional wrestler Andy Williams (born 1977)
 The Butcher Brothers, alter-egos of American film directors Mitchell Altieri and Phil Flores

Arts and entertainment

Fictional characters 
 Billy "The Butcher" Butcher, from the comic series The Boys, its spin-off Butcher, and TV series adaptations
 The Butcher (American Horror Story), from the TV series American Horror Story: Roanoke
 The Butcher, a demon in the Diablo video game series and Heroes of the Storm
 The Butcher, a monster in the video game Silent Hill: Origins
 The Butcher, a physical embodiment of "rage" of the Emotional Electromagnetic Spectrum, the emotion that powers the Red Lantern Corps in the DC Comics universe
 On the British soap opera Eastenders:
 Bianca Butcher
 Diane Butcher
 Frank Butcher
 Liam Butcher
 Mo Butcher
 Ricky Butcher

Film and television
 Le Boucher (The Butcher), a 1970 French drama/thriller
 The Butcher (2006 film), an American horror film
 The Butcher (2007 film), an South Korean horror film
 The Butcher (2009 film), an American action film
 The Butchers (film), a 2014 American horror film
 Butcher's Film Service, a British film production and distribution company
 The Butcher (TV series), a 2019 butchering reality competition show
 Butchers (2020 film) 0 a 2020 American horror film 
 "Butcher, Baker, Candlestick Maker" (The Boys), 2020 television adaptation of the comic miniseries

Music
 "The Butcher" (song), a 2011 song by Radiohead
 Butcher Bros., American record producers

Places 
 Butcher Hills, Montana

 Butcher (or Butcher's) Inlet, on which Cossack, Western Australia is situated
 Butcher Island, off the coast of Mumbai, India
 Butcher Nunatak, Marie Byrd Land, Antarctica
 Butcher Ridge, Oates Land, Antarctica
 Butchers Knob, part of Cooper Mountain
 Butchers Lake, Victoria, Australia
 Butchers Spur, Ross Dependency, Antarctica
 Butcher Hollow, Kentucky

Other uses 
 Butcher, Baker, Candlestickmaker, spin-off comic miniseries of The Boys, following Billy Butcher
 Butcher, a small beer glass in South Australia
 4th Armored Division (United States), nicknamed "Roosevelt's Butchers"
 Butcher baronets, two titles in the Baronetage of the United Kingdom, both extinct
 Shankill Butchers, an Ulster loyalist gang active between 1975 and 1982 in Belfast, Northern Ireland

Lists of people by nickname